Kappa Tucanae, Latinised from, κ Tucanae, is a quadruple star system in the southern constellation Tucana. It is visible to the naked eye as a faint point of light with a combined apparent visual magnitude of either +4.25 or +4.86, depending on the source. The system is located approximately 68 light years from the Sun based on parallax, and is drifting further away with a radial velocity of +8 km/s.

The system consists of two binary pairs separated by 5.3 arcminutes.  The brightest star, Kappa Tucanae A, is a yellow-white F-type subgiant with an apparent magnitude of +5.0.  Its binary companion, Kappa Tucanae B, has a magnitude of 7.74 and is located about 6″ away from the primary. It completes an orbit around the primary every 857 years.

The other binary pair, the magnitude +7.8 C, and the magnitude +8.4 D, are closer to one another, at 1.12 arcseconds, or at least 23 astronomical units. They orbit each other once every 86.2 years.

References

F-type subgiants
4
Tucana (constellation)
Tucanae, Kappa
Durchmusterung objects
007788
005842
0377